Andrew Bairstow (born 16 June 1975) is an English former cricketer. He was a left-handed batsman and a wicket-keeper who played first-class cricket for Derbyshire in 1995.

Career
Bairstow started his career within the Worcestershire Second XI, before moving to Derbyshire, and it was a surprise when the Peakites, without the relative experience of Karl Krikken and defensive technique of Steve Griffiths, called upon the young Bairstow as their cover man. Following an inconspicuous First-class career, Bairstow made a few further appearances for the Derbyshire Second XI before leaving the professional game. In total, he played in three first-class matches. He has played club cricket in the Bradford Premier League for Undercliffe, Cleckheaton, East Bierley and Pudsey Congs. He retired from club cricket in 2016.

Family
Bairstow's father, David, was a former Test cricketer for England, and his younger half-brother Jonny is currently a wicket-keeper and batsman for both Yorkshire and England.

References

External links 

1975 births
Derbyshire cricketers
English cricketers
Living people